is a japanese documentary film directed and produced by Keiko Yagi, released in 2015.

It is the first film in response to the Academy Award winning 2009 anti-whaling documentary film The Cove, and seeks to show the views of both sides of the international whaling debate, particularly focusing on the town of Taiji, Japan.

Synopsis
On March 31, 2014, the International Court of Justice ordered Japan to stop its Antarctic whaling program.

Fearing that ancestral culinary traditions will disappear, director Keiko Yagi decided to investigate and understand what motivates regular attacks against Japan on whaling. With a camera, Keiko Yagi traveled to Taiji, home of Oscar-winning 2009 documentary film "The Cove". For four months, Keiko Yagi interviewed the various protagonists of the film "The Cove", from its director to the people of Taiji through the official organizations and the militant associations.

Cast

Reception
Behind 'The Cove''' received a mostly negative response from Western critics.  Robert Abele of the Los Angeles Times described it as "a regrettably amateurish effort in tone, style and pacing, as if [Yagi's] first cut were her final cut. It's too scattershot to be persuasive, even if occasionally it sparks thought about issues of cultural tradition, unfair international agreements, and nationalistic defensiveness."  Luke Y. Thompson of The Village Voice was also critical of the film, writing, "Japan's answer to the Oscar-winning, 2009 anti-dolphin-hunting documentary The Cove'' is driven more by agenda than much discernible skill in the areas of camera, editing, storytelling, or interview technique."  He added, "Probably about a quarter of the film's runtime is screenshots of web browsers, which is apt, as this is essentially a Condescending Wonka meme taken to feature length."

Accolades 

Montreal World Film Festival, Official Screening (2015)
 London International Filmmaker Festival, Best Director of a Feature Documentary (February 2018)
 Los Angeles Independent Film Festival Awards, First Time Filmmaker (October 2016)
 13th Japan Wildlife Film Festival, New Perspective Award (April 2018)
 Hollywood International Moving Pictures Film Festival, Award of Recognition (October 2016)
 Hollywood International Independent Documentary Awards, Award of Excellence (October 2016)
 Pune Independent Film Festival, Best Woman Filmmaker (Fall 2016)
 International Filmmaker Festival of New York, Honorable Mention (May 2018)
 London Greek Film Festival, Semi-finalist (2018)
 Miami Independent Film Festival, Feature Documentary (2017)
 Calcutta International Cult Film Festival, Golden Fox Award Nominee for Best Educational Film (2017)
 Calcutta International Cult Film Festival, Films of the Month Educational Film Winner (January 2017)
 Portsmouth International Film Festival, Sound in a Documentary (2017)
 Paris Art and Movie Awards, Meilleur Documentaire (2018)

References

External links 
 
 

2015 documentary films
Documentary films about animal rights
Documentary films about environmental issues
Documentary films about ocean life
Documentary films about water and the environment
Japanese documentary films
2010s Japanese films
2010s Japanese-language films